Seethalakshmi Ramaswami College (SRC)  is an autonomous Arts and Science college, located in Tiruchirappalli district of Tamil Nadu, India. This premier women’s institution affiliated to Bharathidasan University., Tiruchirappalli was conferred the autonomy status in 1987. SRC is one among the first seven Higher Educational Institutions (HEIs) of India, to be accredited by the National Assessment and Accreditation Council (NAAC). The college has been awarded A+ grade in the 4th cycle of accreditation by NAAC. The college, spread around a sprawling campus of 24 acres, is a part of the Padmabhushan Sri N. Ramaswami Ayyar Educational Complex.

History 

In 1951, Padmabhushan Shri N. Ramaswami Ayyar, the founding father of SRC, started the institution, after overcoming many unprecedented odds during a period when the society was neither conducive nor supportive to women’s education. He believed in the noble cause of promoting women’s empowerment through education, nurturing values and discipline in the background of Indian tradition and culture. The college which had its humble beginning with 11 students is now an acclaimed edifice of learning and research, producing thousands of graduates, post graduates and research scholars every year. The institution is proudly marching towards its platinum jubilee year, under the leadership of Shri R. Panchapakesan, the managing trustee of the institution.

The institution serves the society by giving access to education to hundreds of first generation women learners to pursue tertiary education and research, at an affordable cost in an amiable ambience. The Community college of the institution offers special entrepreneurial courses and vocational programmes to women students belonging to the socially and economically marginalized sections of the society.

Academics 

The college offers 24 UG, 17 PG, 7 M.Phil., 8 Ph.D., 1 Community College programme and 3 B.Voc. programmes and more than 100 short term certificate courses. The curriculum is designed under OBE - CBCS framework. All the departments have highly qualified faculty members who have specialized in their respective disciplines.

Each department is housed in a separate block and is attached with sophisticated laboratories, libraries and museums. The college also has a state-of-the-art centralized library facility, a language lab and a well-equipped computer center.

The college was awarded DBT Star College status, recognizing the Life Sciences departments and the DST-FIST grant was awarded to the Postgraduate Physical Sciences departments. The college provides a congenial environment for research which has culminated in the generation of patents. The language departments engage themselves in materials production.

The Arts, Commerce, Hospital Administration, Humanities, Languages, Management and Science departments of SRC are involved in innovative academic practices, making the institution a much sought after HEI in South India. The Community college and Vocational departments of the college have helped the students procure employment in government and private sectors and have produced many women entrepreneurs, especially from the rural community.

Research 

SRC has a strong policy to promote research by encouraging its stake holder’s participation in core, interdisciplinary, multidisciplinary and collaborative research. The state-of- the- art infrastructure at the college and financial support of the management have immensely contributed to productive, scientific and socially relevant inventions and findings. There are 8 research departments. Many of the faculty members have won awards and granted patent rights for innovation in research. The faculty members regularly publish their research findings in reputed international and national journals and conference proceedings, which enjoy a high citation index in Scopus and Web of Science. The faculty and research scholars have many collaborations, linkages and Memorandums of Understanding and scores of UGC sponsored major and minor research projects have been carried out in the institution. The college publishes a biannual in-house journal. Many of the departments regularly produce books and collaborative publications. The college has a research committee to monitor all research activities.

Facilities 

The institution has the following exclusive facilities for the students like Hostels, Gym, Canteen, Courts & Grounds, Prayer Hall, Yoga Mandap and Seminar Halls. The management gives away many scholarships to the students under various categories and provides free noon meals to the needy students every day.

Extension Activities 

NCC unit at SRC was established in the year 1957 and the NCC cadets regularly participate in the prestigious Republic Day Parade at Red Fort, New Delhi. The institution is the first women’s college in Tamil Nadu to establish a separate Air Wing unit under NCC called D2 flight. The college is an active participant in Unnat Bharat Abiyan scheme, the flagship programme of Human Resource Development. Under this scheme, the institution serves in the adopted villages for evolving sustainable rural growth. The institution participates in Swachh Bharat activities and has bagged the Swachhatha Hi Seva and Swachh Survekhsan awards. The Centre for Ethics and Human Values promotes a strong ethical grounding to students by inculcating in them the value of commitment and enriching their quality of life. The sports and athletic teams regularly bag trophies. The Indian sprinter Ms.S.Dhanalakshmi, the institution’s proud athletic star has represented India at the Tokyo 2020 Olympics and participated in the World University Athletic Championship held in Italy.

Distinguished Alumnae 

The college has a long tradition of producing eminent women personalities in the national and international arena.  A few of our distinguished alumnae are
	
 Smt. Nirmala Sitharaman - Minister of Finance and Corporate Affairs, Govt. of India.
 Dr.Girija Vaidyanathan IAS - Former Chief Secretary to Govt. of Tamil Nadu.
 Smt. Subbulakshmi – Formerly State Minister for Textiles, Handloom & Small Scale Industries, Govt. of Tamil Nadu.
 Ms.Chandralekha IAS – Former District Collector, Govt. of India.
 Dr.S.Vimala – Supreme Court Judge.
 Dr.K.Meena – Former Vice Chanceller, Bharathidasan University.
 Dr.B.S.Santhi & Dr.M.M. Senthamizh Selvi – Joint Director of Collegiate Education.
 Dr.J.Manjula – Director of Collegiate Education.
 Smt. A.Siva Priya – District Revenue Officer
 Dr.S.Santhi – Former Principal, Queen Mary’s College.
 Smt. Swarna Natarajan – Life Style & Nutrition Consultant, Canada.
 Ms.S.Dhanalakshmi – International Athlete.

References

External links
http://www.srcollege.edu.in/

Educational institutions established in 1951
1951 establishments in Madras State
Colleges affiliated to Bharathidasan University
Universities and colleges in Tiruchirappalli
Academic institutions formerly affiliated with the University of Madras